Khao Khiao may refer to various places in Thailand:
Khao Khiao Massif, Chonburi Province
Khao Khiao, Chonburi, a 789 m mountain in the Khao Khiao Massif
Khao Khiao – Khao Chomphu Wildlife Sanctuary 
Khao Rom, the highest point of the Sankamphaeng Range
Khao Khiao, Nakhon Ratchasima, a 1292 m high mountain in Nakhon Ratchasima Province